Random (Marshall Evan Stone III) is a fictional character and antihero appearing in American comic books published by Marvel Comics. The character was created by writer Peter David for the series X-Factor. He was originally presented as an opponent of X-Factor, but he later became their reluctant ally.

Fictional character biography
The complete origin of Random is unclear. It appears that he was created from a mass of protoplasm by Dark Beast, making Random the continuation of an experiment that Dark Beast began while Sinister's lead scientist in the Age of Apocalypse reality. It is also possible that Random was born normally and then captured and experimented on by Dark Beast. Following Dark Beast's experimentation, the young Random is given the name of Alex, and he uses this name while serving as McCoy's helper in the sewers beneath New York City when he worked with the Morlocks.

"Alex" eventually escapes, shifting his appearance to that of a muscle-bound man and creating the identity of bounty hunter Random. It is unknown if the name Marshall Evan Stone III is his real name or just a name he created for his new Random persona. According to the memories of Charlie Ronalds, a person with Random's powers killed Charlie's parents when Charlie was very young, though Random has never been confirmed as the killer.

In his first encounter with the government-sponsored X-Factor team, Random is called in (presumably by the government) to bring back a group of Genoshan renegades called the X-Patriots, who refuse to leave a hospital where one of their comrades is being treated. Random and X-Factor clash and, wanting to end the fight quickly, team leader Havok buys out Random's contract.

Because of his success as a bounty hunter, Random is contracted to go after X-Factor member Polaris. During their battle, Random tells her that the same government that employs her hired him to kill her. Polaris doesn't believe him, but he assures her that there are mutant haters in the government. After a brief scuffle, Polaris leaves, later confessing to Havok that she felt Random was holding back during the fight, as if he wanted her to win.

Joining X-Factor
After X-Factor encountered the religious fanatic Haven, Random visits X-Factor members Wolfsbane and Strong Guy, confessing to them that the government agents who had previously hired him are now after his life as well. In exchange for protection, he agrees to tell X-Factor who hired him to kill Polaris. The team sets out to find Haven, and Forge hires Random's services against Haven for $15,000 and a new car, so he tags along. When they locate Haven, she transports Random and the rest of X-Factor to a pocket dimension where she shows them how much they really need her. In this world, Random begins to revert to his protoplasmic state, causing Haven to point out that she knows the truth behind his bloodthirsty façade. When she returns the team to the real world, Random is completely gelatinous but quickly pulls himself together and refuses to talk to the team about it.

Following Haven's defeat, Forge pays Random and offers him a permanent job on the team, which he declines. Shortly thereafter, Random, Forge, and Polaris track down Colonel Malone, the man who hired Random to kill Polaris. The trio find him, but he commits suicide before they can question him. However, Malone's assistant informs them that the government never planned on killing Polaris—they only wanted to test her limits as part of their plan to use her as a fail-safe against Magneto. If Random had defeated her, she would have been brought in and brainwashed to become the government's weapon.

The Brotherhood
Random returns after Havok re-forms the Brotherhood of Mutants with Dark Beast, Fatale, and Aurora, among others. He and Havok clash until Havok reveals to him the true nature of his mission: He is attempting to undermine the Brotherhood from within. The duo then help liberate the subjects of some of McCoy's inhumane experiments.

Random is next hired by Exodus (along with Feral, Pyro, Avalanche, the Fenris twins, and Omega Red) to assist the Acolytes. Exodus promises to help his new operatives find a cure for the Legacy Virus if they capture the Knights of Wundagore, but when they fail, Exodus leaves them stranded in the Savage Land.

Random resurfaces on Genosha during Magneto's rule and is quickly dispatched when the ad hoc Genoshan Assault X-Men squad attacks the island to rescue Professor X.

Weapon X

Random is later captured by the refurbished Weapon X Program in their attempt to exterminate mutants. He is placed in Neverland, a mutant concentration camp, and attempts a coup with the help of Diamond Lil. However, the inmates don't realize that their powers are being negated by Leech, and they are both severely punished for their actions.

Post M-Day
Random is one of the few mutants that retained their superhuman powers after M-Day. Alongside Tempo, Unuscione, and Frenzy, Random again works with Exodus, joining his new team of Acolytes and participating in an attack on the S.H.I.E.L.D. Helicarrier.

Random and the Acolytes later attack the Xavier Institute on a mission from Mister Sinister to retrieve Destiny's diaries. The diaries they find are fake, and after a battle with Colossus, Shadowcat, and several students, the Acolytes are forced to return to Sinister without completing their mission. Random is present with the rest of the Acolytes in the final battle of "Messiah Complex".

X-Men: Legacy
When Professor Xavier returns to New Avalon to confront Exodus, Random is still among the Acolytes. Xavier convinces Exodus to disband the group and find a new way to help mutantkind, and Random, Amelia Voght, and Omega Sentinel decide to relocate to San Francisco in response to the X-Men's call for all mutants to relocate there.

Random is next seen on Utopia during Bastion's attack on the island. Random, along with Scalphunter, Sack, Litterbug, and others, is rallied to Utopia's defense by Cyclops, who declares, "Today you are all combatants. You are all X-Men".

Following the battle, Random attends Cable's funeral. When Cyclops puts together a squad of X-Men led by Rogue and Magneto to help with reconstruction efforts in San Francisco, Random is included in the group, along with Colossus, Psylocke, Omega Sentinel, Danger, Hellion, and Hope.

Random later appears as a member of the Utopians alongside Elixir, Karma, Masque, Madison Jeffries, and Tabitha Smith.

House of X
Random later appears as one of the villainous mutants invited to come live on the newly created mutant island of Krakoa, provided he no longer holds any grudges towards his fellow mutants.

Powers and abilities
Random's body is made of morphing protoplasm which can change into almost any shape he can imagine and commonly changes his forearms into weapons that fire hardened protoplasm projectiles from his own biomatter. He is able to randomly counteract any force or mutant ability directed at him, alter his mass and strength and rapidly regenerate damaged or detached/severed biomatter and limbs.

Reception
 In 2014, Entertainment Weekly ranked Random 91st in their "Let's rank every X-Man ever" list.

In other media

Television
 Random made non-speaking cameo appearances in X-Men: The Animated Series. In "Sanctuary", Random is shown amongst the mutants that reside on Asteroid M. In "Secrets Not Long Buried", Random is one of the many mutant residents of the mutant-dominated community of Skull Mesa.

References

External links
 Random at Marvel.com
 

Characters created by Joe Quesada
Characters created by Peter David
Comics characters introduced in 1993
Fictional amorphous creatures
Fictional mercenaries in comics
Marvel Comics characters who are shapeshifters
Marvel Comics characters with accelerated healing
Marvel Comics characters with superhuman strength
Marvel Comics mutants
Marvel Comics superheroes
Marvel Comics supervillains